Guilford Lake is an unincorporated community and census-designated place in northeastern Hanover Township, Columbiana County, Ohio, United States. It surrounds the eponymous Guilford Lake reservoir. The population was 1,188 at the 2020 census. It is part of the Salem micropolitan area and the greater Youngstown–Warren area.

History

Guilford Lake was constructed as a canal feeder reservoir for the Sandy and Beaver Canal in 1834. It took its name from Edward H. Gill, chief engineer of the canal company. When the canal era ended, local farmers breached the dam, drained the lake, and used the fertile lake bottom for farm land. In 1932, a new dam was completed and the land surrounding it was designated a state park in 1949.  The community was first listed as a CDP for the 2020 census.

References

Census-designated places in Ohio
Census-designated places in Columbiana County, Ohio